Hans Beukes is a Namibian writer and former activist. Beukes was one of the leaders of the Coloured Baster community and one of the earliest petitioners for South West African independence when he travelled to the United Nations in 1956. To visit the UN, Beukes had to be smuggled out of South Africa in a Volkswagen Beetle. Beukes later earned a scholarship to study in Norway, where he still lived as of 2010. He only returned to Namibia briefly prior to independence in 1989. Beukes is the Scandinavian correspondent for the Cape Town-based Die Burger newspaper. He published his memoirs Long Road to Liberation. An Exiled Namibian Activist's Perspective in 2014.

References

Year of birth missing (living people)
Living people
Coloured Namibian people
Namibian expatriates in Norway
Namibian writers
Namibian journalists
Namibian independence activists
21st-century Namibian writers